Biomedical Engineering: Applications, Basis and Communications is a scientific journal dedicated to basic and clinical research in the field of biomedical engineering. It is published by World Scientific. The journal covers topics such as bioelectronics, biomaterials, biomechanics, bioinformatics, nano-biological sciences and clinical engineering.

Abstracting and indexing 
The journal is indexed in Inspec, COMPENDEX, Scopus, EMA, EMBASE.

References 

Publications established in 1989
Biomedical engineering journals
World Scientific academic journals